Pyles is a surname. Notable people with the surname include:

People 
 Malia Pyles (born 2000), American actress
 Marjorie Pyles Honzik (1908–2003)
 Rodney Pyles (born 1945), American politician; Democratic member of the West Virginia House of Delegates
 Stephan Pyles (born 1952), American author of five cookbooks on Texan and Southwestern Cuisine
 Terry Pyles, American artist from Alaska
 Vern Pyles (1919–2013), American politician; Republican member of the Pennsylvania House of Representatives
 Jackie Pyles, member of the American girl group School Gyrls

See also 
 Pyle (surname), a similar surname

References